The women's road race was one of the cycling events at the 2000 Summer Olympics. The race was held on Tuesday, 26 September 2000 with a race distance of 119.7 km. Because the top three were so close there was a photo finish.

Results
Final classification

References

External links
Official Olympic Report

Road cycling at the 2000 Summer Olympics
Cycling at the Summer Olympics – Women's road race
2000 in women's road cycling
Women's events at the 2000 Summer Olympics